Baron Bourke of Brittas, of the County of Limerick, was a title in the Peerage of Ireland created on 17 February 1618 for Theobald Bourke. He was the son of Theobald Bourke, son of William Bourke, 1st Baron Bourke of Castleconnell (see Baron Bourke of Castleconnell) and Lady Mary Burke. He was the younger brother of John Bourke, 2nd Baron Bourke of Castleconnell, and Richard Bourke, 3rd Baron Bourke of Castleconnell. The third Baron was attainted in 1691 being loyal to King James II and the title forfeited.

Barons Bourke (1618)
Theobald Bourke, 1st Baron Bourke of Brittas (died 1654)  
John Bourke, 2nd Baron Bourke of Brittas (died 1668)  
Theobald Bourke, 3rd Baron Bourke of Brittas (died after 1691)

See also
House of Burgh, an Anglo-Norman and Hiberno-Norman dynasty founded in 1193
Baron Bourke of Castleconnell
Sir Edmund de Burgh (1298–1338), Irish knight and ancestor of the Burke family of Clanwilliam

References

Forfeited baronies in the Peerage of Ireland
Noble titles created in 1618